The Victor Chandler Poker Cup (often abbreviated to The Victor Poker Cup or The VC Poker Cup) was a poker tournament held in 2004 and 2005 in England for broadcast on Sky Sports.

The £5,000 buy-in event commenced in 2004 and is played out in a no limit Texas hold 'em format.

2004
The event was held from 23-24 July in London. 100 competitors took part, with the following making the final table.

The event is noted for featuring three of the four members of The Hendon Mob at the same final table, together with John Kabbaj, who is considered their unofficial fifth member.

Other British players who played the event include Jac Arama, Bruce "Elvis Senior" Atkinson, "Barmy" Barny Boatman, Dave "El Blondie" Colclough, Victoria Coren, Zac Goldsmith, Vinnie Jones, John McCririck, Grub Smith, Willie "The Dice Man" Tann, Simon "Aces" Trumper, Dave "The Devilfish" Ulliott, Mickey "The Worm" Wernick and "Mad" Marty Wilson.

Foreign players included "Gentleman" Liam Flood, Noel Furlong, Tony G, Mel "Silver Fox" Judah, "The Flying Dutchman" Marcel Lüske, "The Don" Donnacha O'Dea, Padraig Parkinson, Barry Shulman and Charalambos "Bambos" Xanthos.

2005
The event was held from 1-5 August in London. 96 competitors took part, with the final 12 competitors progressing to semi-finals.

Semi-final 1

Semi-final 2

Final

External links
Official site

Poker tournaments in Europe
Television shows about poker